Wang Maorun (6 May 1936 – 17 October 2008) was a general in the People's Liberation Army of China who served as political commissar of the PLA National Defence University between 1995 and 2001.

He was a representative of the 11th National Congress of the Chinese Communist Party,  member of the 14th Central Commission for Discipline Inspection,member of the 15th Central Committee of the Chinese Communist Party, delegate to the 7th National People's Congress and a member of the Standing Committee of the 10th National People's Congress.

Biography
Wang was born in the town of Moyedao, Rongcheng County, Shandong, on 6 May 1936. 

He enlisted in the People's Liberation Army (PLA) in May 1951, and joined the Chinese Communist Party (CCP) in July 1956. In 1964, he served in the 67th Group Army and stayed there for 16 years, interspersed with three years in Political Department of the Jinan Military Region from 1973 to 1976. In September 1983, he entered the PLA Military Academy, where he graduated in July 1985. He was transferred to the Lanzhou Military Region in June 1985 and appointed director of Political Department, and was promoted to deputy political commissar and secretary of its Commission for Discipline Inspection in April 1990. He was commissioned as political commissar of the PLA National Defence University in July 1995, and served until July 2001. In March 2003, he took office as a member of the National People's Congress Environment Protection and Resources Conservation Committee.

He was promoted to the rank of major general (shaojiang) in September 1988, lieutenant general (zhongjiang) in July 1993, and general (shangjiang) in March 1998. 

On 17 October 2008, he died from an illness in Beijing, at the age of 72.

References

1936 births
2008 deaths
People from Rongcheng, Shandong
People's Liberation Army generals from Shandong
People's Republic of China politicians from Shandong
Chinese Communist Party politicians from Shandong
Members of the 15th Central Committee of the Chinese Communist Party
Delegates to the 7th National People's Congress
Members of the Standing Committee of the 10th National People's Congress
Political Commissars of the PLA National Defence University